Roy Kuijpers (born 17 January 2000) is a Dutch professional footballer who plays as a forward for Eredivisie club RKC Waalwijk.

Early life
Kuijpers was born in Zwolle, where his father ran a company, but the family returned to Brabant at a young age, settling in Son en Breugel.

Career
A youth product of FC Den Bosch, Kuijpers signed with Vitesse in 2019. He returned to Den Bosch on loan on 2 January 2021. He made his professional debut with FC Den Bosch in a 2–1 Eerste Divisie win over Jong AZ on 11 January 2021.

In the summer of 2021, Kuijpers began playing for FC Den Bosch on an amateur contract. He scored nine goals in 17 league games during the first half of the 2021–22 season. The club offered him a professional deal twice, but on 3 December 2021 it was announced that Kuijpers signed with Eredivisie club RKC Waalwijk on a contract until July 2025. He made his debut on 5 December, coming on as a substitute in the second half before scoring the 2–1 winner in injury time against NEC, after an assist by Finn Stokkers.

References

External links
 

2000 births
Living people
Sportspeople from Zwolle
Dutch footballers
Association football forwards
SBV Vitesse players
FC Den Bosch players
RKC Waalwijk players
Eerste Divisie players
Eredivisie players
Footballers from Overijssel